2014 Women's World Hot Air Balloon Championships was 1st edition of World Hot Air Ballooning Championships for women held in Leszno, Poland from September 8 to September 13, 2014. Total of 16 tasks were held.

Final ranking

References

External links 
 FAI profile
 

2014 in air sports
2014 in Polish women's sport
Ballooning competitions